Niobrara County School District #1 is a public school district based in Lusk, Wyoming, United States.

Geography
Niobrara County School District #1 serves all of Niobrara County and a small portion of northwestern Goshen County. The following communities are served by the district:

Incorporated places
Town of Lusk
Town of Manville
Town of Van Tassell
Census-designated places (Note: All census-designated places are unincorporated.)
Lance Creek

Schools
Niobrara County High School (Grades 7–12)
Lusk Elementary & Middle School (Grades K-6)
Lance Creek School (Grades K-3)

Student demographics
The following figures are as of October 1, 2020.

Total District Enrollment: 1397
Student enrollment by gender
Male: 673 (48.17%)
Female: 724 (51.83%)
Student enrollment by ethnicity
White (not Hispanic): 1111 (79.53%)
Hispanic: 228 (16.32%)
Asian or Pacific Islander: 14 (1.00%)
American Indian or Alaskan Native: 23 (1.65%)
Black (not Hispanic): 10 (0.72%)

See also
List of school districts in Wyoming

References

External links
Niobrara County School District #1 – official site.

Education in Niobrara County, Wyoming
School districts in Wyoming